Performance BMW is a monthly British car magazine, aimed primarily at BMW owners, published by Kelsey Media, situated in Kent. The magazine was launched in 1998. Its current editor is Elizabeth de Latour.

The magazine focuses on the modification of BMWs for performance and styling.

References

External links

Automobile magazines published in the United Kingdom
Monthly magazines published in the United Kingdom
Magazines established in 2001
Mass media in Kent
2001 establishments in the United Kingdom